Fotballklubben Bodø/Glimt is a Norwegian professional football club from the town of Bodø that currently plays in Eliteserien, the Norwegian top division. The club was founded in 1916 and is frequently referred to by its original club name, "Glimt".

Bodø/Glimt are the reigning champions in Norway after winning 2021 Eliteserien. They also have won the now defunct Northern Norwegian Cup nine times, Norwegian Cup twice, the Norwegian top division twice, in 2020 and in 2021, and finished second in 1977, 1993, 2003, and 2019. They were the first team from northern Norway to win a national title by winning the cup in 1975, and also the first team from the region to win the national league.

Glimt is known for the yellow kits and the huge yellow toothbrushes that the supporters carry to the matches — a supporter symbol from the 1970s. After being promoted to the top flight ahead of the 2018 season, the club has experienced the greatest success in its history, winning the league twice in a row, reaching the quarterfinals of the UEFA Europa Conference League and the Play-off round of the Champions League before dropping into the Europa League in the following season.

History 
While other towns in Nordland county like Narvik, Mo i Rana and Mosjøen had started their football clubs earlier, the larger town of Bodø was without a major football club until the latter part of 1916. The new club was founded as Fotballklubben Glimt ("Glimt" meaning "Flash" in English). One of the founders was Erling Tjærandsen, who also became the club's first president and later an honorary club member. Tjærandsen was also a known footballer and skier. Glimt's first match was against Bodø Highschool, because Glimt was the only football club in town.
 
In 1919 Glimt won their first title: County Champions of Nordland. In the 1920s, Glimt suffered from bad morale and poor finances. At one point, there were talks about merging Glimt into the Ski Club B. & O.I, but following discussions, the intentions were not carried through. The club received an infusion of new encouragement through visiting footballing stars and coaches from southern Norway such as Jørgen Juve in 1929. In the 1930s Glimt also began training indoors to reduce the impact of the severe arctic winters.

This new approach in the late 1920s and early 1930s yielded some positive results and Glimt have since been a top club in Northern Norway, winning nine North-Norwegian championships, and nationally in Norway since the 1970s.

The club changed its name in 1948, due to an older club from Trøndelag having the same name, and has since gone by the name Fotballklubben Bodø/Glimt. The slash was originally a hyphen, but was gradually changed in the 1980s to avoid confusion as hyphens were often used to separate teams on betting coupons and in result tables in newspapers.

Teams from Northern Norway were not allowed to compete in the Norwegian cup-competition until 1963. In their first appearance in the Norwegian FA cup in 1963, Bodø/Glimt managed to get as far as the fourth round after a home win 7–1 over Nordil, and two away wins. The first beating Nidelv (from Trondheim) and then a mighty win over Rosenborg. In the fourth round, Glimt had to play another away game, this time against Frigg from Oslo. Frigg won 2–0 and Glimt was out of the Cup. However, Bodø/Glimt had proven that teams from Northern Norway could play at the same level as the southern teams.

It was not until 1972 that northern teams had the right to gain promotion to the Norwegian top division. This was due to the old belief that the teams from Nordland, Troms, and Finnmark could not compete at the same level as the southern teams. Bodø/Glimt is one of three teams from Northern Norway that have played in the Norwegian top division, the others being Tromsø and Mjølner.

From 1973 Norway had three second divisions: two divisions for southern teams and one for northern teams. Bodø/Glimt took three years to gain promotion, due to the promotion rules. The first place holders in the two southern divisions gained instant promotion, but the first place holder in the northern second division had to compete in play-off matches against the two second-place holders from the south. This league system caused a lot of bitterness in the north. This worsened in 1975 when Bodø/Glimt, as the first club from Northern-Norway, won the Norwegian Cup, but did not gain promotion due to the special play-off rules for North-Norwegian clubs.

In the 1974 and 1975 season, Bodø/Glimt won their division (they had played a few draws but no losses), but still lost in the play-offs.

In 1976, Bodø/Glimt managed at last to beat the league-system with a 4–0 win over Odd and a 1–1 draw against Lyn, making Glimt the second North-Norwegian team to gain promotion to the top division, after FK Mjølner's promotion in 1971. Not until the late 1970s did the Norwegian Football Association changed the promotion rules; the play-off matches for Northern clubs were dropped. From then on there was no difference where a club had its home-ground.

After a glorious top-division debut in 1977 — second place in the league and the cup, both against Lillestrøm — Bodø/Glimt played four seasons at the top level before relegation in 1980, finishing last at 12th place.

The 1980s were the darkest hours in the club history, with Bodø/Glimt playing in the 2nd division and the regional 3rd division. For a couple of years in the mid-1980s, they weren't even the best team in Bodø, with rivals Grand Bodø surpassing them in the standings. But the tide turned in 1991. With coach Jan Muri in charge, Glimt was promoted to 1st division. The following season they hired Trond Sollied as coach, and the team won the 1st division in the 1992 season. At last, in 1993, Bodø/Glimt was back in the top-division, and as in the debut season of 1977 they took second place in the league. This time they also managed to win the cup final (a 2–0 win over Strømsgodset). The Cup-Championship was the crowning of three remarkable seasons, going from 2nd division to 2nd place in the top-division in only three years — an achievement rarely seen in the Norwegian league system.

Since reentering the top division Bodø/Glimt have had a rather checkered performance-chart. A good league performance one season has usually been followed with near relegation the next.  This was illustrated with the 1993 and 1994 seasons when Glimt won the cup and became league runners-up, in 1994 only a better goal-difference allowed Bodø/Glimt to stay in the top division.

Another example of the rollercoaster ride of Bodø/Glimt league performance is the 2003 and 2004 seasons. In 2003 season the club finished runner-up behind league valedictorians Rosenborg. The team also lost the 2003 Norwegian Cup Final to Rosenborg. In the 2004 season Glimt finished third last and had to play a two-game qualification match against Kongsvinger to avoid relegation. Glimt lost the first game 0–1 in Kongsvinger, but soundly defeated Kongsvinger in Bodø by the score of 4–0, winning 4–1 on aggregate.

After the club's comeback in 1993, Glimt played continuously in the Norwegian top division for 12 seasons, for a total of 16 top division seasons. In the 2005 season however, Bodø/Glimt was relegated.

Life in the Adecco League proved harder than most fans had anticipated.  Many were disappointed when Glimt failed to secure the third place play-off spot they had held during most of the course of the season, finally ending in fifth place. The season was tainted by financial difficulties, forcing the team to sell their top scorer Håvard Sakariassen and captain Cato Andrè Hansen to promotion rivals Bryne in the middle of the season. This had to be done to stabilize their financial situation, which was so poor that the Norwegian Football Association threatened to not give the team their playing license for next season, which would have resulted disastrously in forced relegation to the second division.

The poor results towards the end of the season finally prompted the board of the supporters’ club to write an open letter in which the training and alcohol consumption habits of certain unnamed players were criticised. In a bizarre twist a few weeks later, the supporters’ club was threatened with a lawsuit in the multi-million class by former coach Trond Sollied, who was briefly mentioned in a by-sentence of the letter as having been in charge when the bad habits of the team had begun. All claims were quickly retracted by the supporters’ club.

In the second season in Adeccoligaen, Bodø/Glimt achieved promotion back to Tippeligaen after two promotion matches – once again, as in 1976 – against Odd. Bodø/Glimt was the first team for nine years in Norway to win the promotion matches to Tippeligaen. This was also the final match for Bodø/Glimt for the Norwegian legends Erik Hoftun and Kent Bergersen. The return to Tippeligaen was a successful one as the team performed well to end in 4th place in 2008, but the next season followed the club trend of struggling after a good season, and Bodø/Glimt was again relegated with a 15th place, second to last in the league.

In 2013, Bodø/Glimt was again promoted to Tippeligaen, after becoming the winner of Adecco-ligaen. Coach Jan Halvor Halvorsen managed to keep Glimt in the top lead for the next two seasons.

Ahead of the 2016 season, club legend Aasmund Bjørkan was appointed as head coach. The team started the season well, and was on top of the league table after three games. However, Glimt lost the next six games. The place in the top league nevertheless looked secure with four games remaining, but Glimt lost all of them and was relegated. Despite relegation, Aasmund Bjørkan stayed on as head coach, and the club brought in then unknown Kjetil Knutsen as assistant coach. Bodø/Glimt won the league by a 16-point margin, and was once again back at the top flight. Aasmund Bjørkan was named coach of the year, but stepped down as head coach, and took the role as sporting director at the club ahead of the 2018 season. Assistant Kjetil Knutsen was promoted to head coach. Glimt made a decent performance during 2018, however a record of 14 draws saw them finishing only in 11th place, but retaining their status as a top-flight team.

Ahead of the 2019 season, Glimt was mentioned among the relegation candidates by most pundits, especially since the club had sold key players like captain Martin Bjørnbak and top scorer Kristian Fardal Opseth. Glimt surprised everyone, and clinched a 2nd place in the Norwegian Eliteserien. Kjetil Knutsen was named coach of the year, and Håkon Evjen was named both player of the year and young player of the year. Ahead of the 2020 season, Glimt again sold several key players, among them captain Ricardo Friedrich and Håkon Evjen, and was not considered among the title candidates. However, Glimt performed a record breaking season, winning 26 games and scoring 103 goals in 30 matches. Bodø/Glimt won the Eliteserien for the first time in history, also becoming the first team from Northern Norway to win the Eliteserien. Again Kjetil Knutsen was named coach of the year. Philip Zinckernagel was named player of the year, having contributed 19 goals and 18 assists. Ahead of the 2021 season, Bodø/Glimt had sold their three front men Philip Zinckernagel, Jens Petter Hauge and Kasper Junker. These three players scored all together 60 goals and provided 35 assists in the 2020 season, and Glimt had not brought in clear replacements for these players. Pundits were again skeptical to Glimts title chances, but again Glimt surprised everyone, and were crowned back-to-back league champions after a 3–0 victory at Mjøndalen in the last match of the season. 

As a result of the 2019 league finish, Glimt qualified for the UEFA Europa League. Following two wins against Lithuanian teams, Glimt faced AC Milan at San Siro in the third qualifying round, narrowly losing 2-3. In the 2021-22 European season, the results drastically improved. After losing the first Champions league qualifying round tie against Legia Warszawa, Glimt qualified for the Europa Conference League group stage (in the process defeating Zalgiris from Vilnius for the second time in two years).

Having been drawn into group C, Glimt first defeated Zorya Luhansk, and then drew CSKA Sofia 0-0 away. Glimt then defeated group-winner favourite A.S. Roma 6-1 at home at Aspmyra. This was Roma's biggest defeat in European competitions since losing 1-6 to Barcelona in the 2015-16 Champions league group stage, and their biggest loss in any non-Champions League tournament. The away game two weeks later at Stadio Olimpico finished 2-2. After winning their home game against CSKA Sofia and drawing their away game against Zorya, Glimt finished in second place in the group stage without a single loss (and one point behind Roma). In the subsequent knockout phase, Glimt first defeated Celtic F.C. both home and away in the play-offs, and then AZ on aggregate in the round of 16. The aggregate win against AZ was sealed by an extra time goal from Alfons Sampsted away at Alkmaar. Glimt then proceeded to draw Roma as their opponent once again for the quarter-finals. The first quarter-final at Aspmyra again resulted in a Glimt win, this time 2-1. Notably, of the eleven starting players from the group stage win, only four were present in the starting line-up for the home quarter-final.

Domestic history

{|class="wikitable"
|-bgcolor="#efefef"
! Season
!
! Tier
! Pos.
! Pl.
! W
! D
! L
! GS
! GA
! P
!Cup
!Notes
|-
|1963
|3. divisjon district IX
|3rd
|align=right | 1
|align=right|10||align=right|9||align=right|1||align=right|0
|align=right|45||align=right|10||align=right|19
|Fourth round
|Promotion not possible
|-
|1964
|3. divisjon district IX
|3rd
|align=right | 1
|align=right|10||align=right|10||align=right|0||align=right|0
|align=right|39||align=right|5||align=right|20
|Third round
|Promotion not possible
|-
|1965
|3. divisjon district IX
|3rd
|align=right | 1
|align=right|10||align=right|8||align=right|1||align=right|1
|align=right|37||align=right|8||align=right|17
|Third round
|Promotion not possible
|-
|1966
|3. divisjon district IX
|3rd
|align=right | 2
|align=right|10||align=right|7||align=right|2||align=right|1
|align=right|37||align=right|9||align=right|16
|Third round
|Promotion not possible
|-
|1967
|3. divisjon district IX-X
|3rd
|align=right | 3
|align=right|10||align=right|4||align=right|2||align=right|4
|align=right|21||align=right|14||align=right|10
|Second round
|Promotion not possible
|-
|1968
|3. divisjon district IX-X
|3rd
|align=right | 1
|align=right|10||align=right|5||align=right|4||align=right|1
|align=right|19||align=right|9||align=right|14
|Third round
|Promotion not possible
|-
|1969
|3. divisjon district IX-X
|3rd
|align=right | 2
|align=right|10||align=right|7||align=right|0||align=right|3
|align=right|35||align=right|11||align=right|14
|Third round
|Promotion not possible
|-
|1970
|2. divisjon district IX-X
|2nd
|align=right | 2
|align=right|14||align=right|7||align=right|4||align=right|3
|align=right|40||align=right|14||align=right|17
|First round
|Promotion not possible
|}

1971 was the first year northern Norwegian teams could win promotion for the top division (First possible year in the top division would have been 1972). Until 1978, the winner of the northern Norwegian group of the second tier had to enter promotion playoffs against the second placed teams of the two southern Norwegian second tier groups. 1979 was thus the first year northern Norwegian teams competed on equal terms as the southern Norwegian teams.

{|class="wikitable"
|-bgcolor="#efefef"
! Season
!
! Tier
! Pos.
! Pl.
! W
! D
! L
! GS
! GA
! P
!Cup
!Notes
|-
|1971
|2. divisjon district IX-X
|2nd
|align=right | 5
|align=right|14||align=right|5||align=right|2||align=right|7
|align=right|10||align=right|19||align=right|12
|Third round
|
|-
|1972
|2. divisjon district IX-X
|2nd
|align=right | 2
|align=right|14||align=right|4||align=right|8||align=right|2
|align=right|23||align=right|10||align=right|16
|Fourth round
|
|-
|1973
|2. divisjon district IX-X
|2nd
|align=right | 3
|align=right|14||align=right|8||align=right|1||align=right|5
|align=right|34||align=right|16||align=right|17
|First round
|
|-
|1974
|2. divisjon district IX-X
|2nd
|align=right | 1
|align=right|14||align=right|11||align=right|3||align=right|0
|align=right|54||align=right|4||align=right|25
|Semi-final
|Lost promotion to 1. divisjon playoffs
|-
|1975
|2. divisjon district IX-X
|2nd
|align=right | 1
|align=right|14||align=right|14||align=right|0||align=right|0
|align=right|55||align=right|12||align=right|28
|bgcolor=gold|Winner
|Lost promotion to 1. divisjon playoffs
|-
|1976
|2. divisjon district IX-XI
|2nd
|align=right bgcolor=#DDFFDD|1
|align=right|14||align=right|13||align=right|1||align=right|0
|align=right|60||align=right|11||align=right|27
|Quarter-final
|Promoted to 1. divisjon through playoffs
|-
|1977
|1. divisjon
|Top
|align=right bgcolor=silver|2
|align=right|22||align=right|10||align=right|8||align=right|4
|align=right|33||align=right|24||align=right|28
|bgcolor=silver|Final
|
|-
|1978
|1. divisjon
|Top
|align=right | 9
|align=right|22||align=right|6||align=right|6||align=right|10
|align=right|37||align=right|37||align=right|18
|Third round
|
|-
|1979
|1. divisjon
|Top
|align=right | 7
|align=right|22||align=right|8||align=right|5||align=right|9
|align=right|19||align=right|26||align=right|21
|Second round
|
|-
|1980
|1. divisjon
|Top
|align=right bgcolor="#FFCCCC"| 12
|align=right|22||align=right|5||align=right|2||align=right|15
|align=right|13||align=right|43||align=right|12
|Fourth round
|Relegated to 2. divisjon
|-
|1981
|2. divisjon group B
|2nd
|align=right | 7
|align=right|22||align=right|5||align=right|11||align=right|6
|align=right|24||align=right|24||align=right|21
|Third round
|
|-
|1982
|2. divisjon group A
|2nd
|align=right | 8
|align=right|22||align=right|7||align=right|7||align=right|8
|align=right|26||align=right|24||align=right|21
|Fourth round
|
|-
|1983
|2. divisjon group B
|2nd
|align=right bgcolor="#FFCCCC"| 12
|align=right|22||align=right|2||align=right|5||align=right|15
|align=right|13||align=right|41||align=right|9
|Third round
|
|-
|1984
|3. divisjon group F
|3rd
|align=right |3
|align=right|18||align=right|9||align=right|4||align=right|5
|align=right|33||align=right|21||align=right|22
|Second round
|
|-
|1985
|3. divisjon group F
|3rd
|align=right |2
|align=right|18||align=right|13||align=right|4||align=right|1
|align=right|61||align=right|12||align=right|30
|Second round
|
|-
|1986
|3. divisjon group F
|3rd
|align=right bgcolor=#DDFFDD| 1
|align=right|18||align=right|17||align=right|1||align=right|0
|align=right|64||align=right|10||align=right|35
|Fourth round
|Promoted to 2. divisjon
|-
|1987
|2. divisjon group B
|2nd
|align=right |7
|align=right|22||align=right|9||align=right|4||align=right|9
|align=right|38||align=right|33||align=right|31
|Quarter-final
|3 points per win introduced ahead of 1987 season
|-
|1988
|2. divisjon group B
|2nd
|align=right |6
|align=right|22||align=right|9||align=right|3||align=right|10
|align=right|41||align=right|37||align=right|30
|Fourth round
|
|-
|1989
|2. divisjon group B
|2nd
|align=right bgcolor="#FFCCCC"| 12
|align=right|22||align=right|2||align=right|8||align=right|12
|align=right|25||align=right|51||align=right|14
|Third round
|Relegated to 3. divisjon
|-
|1990
|3. divisjon group F
|3rd
|align=right |2
|align=right|22||align=right|15||align=right|5||align=right|2
|align=right|64||align=right|21||align=right|50
|Third round
|
|-
|1991
|2. divisjon group 6
|3rd 1
|align=right bgcolor=#DDFFDD| 1
|align=right|22||align=right|19||align=right|2||align=right|1
|align=right|67||align=right|16||align=right|59
|First round
|Promoted to 1. divisjon
|-
|1992
|1. divisjon group A
|2nd
|align=right bgcolor=#DDFFDD| 1
|align=right|22||align=right|16||align=right|4||align=right|2
|align=right|69||align=right|21||align=right|52
|Quarter-final
|Promoted to Tippeligaen
|-
|1993
|Tippeligaen
|Top
|align=right bgcolor=silver|2
|align=right|22||align=right|14||align=right|3||align=right|5
|align=right|51||align=right|24||align=right|45
|bgcolor=gold|Winner
|
|-
|1994
|Tippeligaen
|Top
|align=right |10
|align=right|22||align=right|5||align=right|7||align=right|10
|align=right|30||align=right|46||align=right|22
|Fourth round
|
|-
|1995
|Tippeligaen
|Top
|align=right bgcolor=#cc9966|3
|align=right|26||align=right|12||align=right|7||align=right|7
|align=right|65||align=right|43||align=right|43
|Fourth round
|
|-
|1996
|Tippeligaen
|Top
|align=right |10
|align=right|26||align=right|9||align=right|4||align=right|13
|align=right|44||align=right|49||align=right|31
|bgcolor=silver|Final
|
|-
|1997
|Tippeligaen
|Top
|align=right |7
|align=right|26||align=right|10||align=right|7||align=right|9
|align=right|39||align=right|34||align=right|37
|Semi-final
|
|-
|1998
|Tippeligaen
|Top
|align=right |5
|align=right|26||align=right|9||align=right|9||align=right|8
|align=right|47||align=right|47||align=right|36
|Quarter-final
|
|-
|1999
|Tippeligaen
|Top
|align=right |9
|align=right|26||align=right|10||align=right|4||align=right|12
|align=right|52||align=right|54||align=right|34
|Fourth round
|
|-
|2000
|Tippeligaen
|Top
|align=right |10
|align=right|26||align=right|6||align=right|10||align=right|10
|align=right|48||align=right|59||align=right|28
|Semi-final
|
|-
|2001
|Tippeligaen
|Top
|align=right |9
|align=right|26||align=right|7||align=right|8||align=right|11
|align=right|45||align=right|47||align=right|29
|Fourth round
|
|-
|2002
|Tippeligaen
|Top
|align=right |10
|align=right|26||align=right|9||align=right|4||align=right|13
|align=right|38||align=right|41||align=right|31
|Fourth round
|
|-
|2003
|Tippeligaen
|Top
|align=right bgcolor=silver|2
|align=right|26||align=right|14||align=right|5||align=right|7
|align=right|45||align=right|30||align=right|47
|bgcolor=silver|Final
|
|-
|2004
|Tippeligaen
|Top
|align=right |12
|align=right|26||align=right|7||align=right|6||align=right|13
|align=right|28||align=right|41||align=right|27
|Fourth round
|Avoided relegation through playoffs
|-
|2005
|Tippeligaen
|Top
|align=right bgcolor="#FFCCCC"| 14
|align=right|26||align=right|6||align=right|6||align=right|14
|align=right|29||align=right|45||align=right|24
|Fourth round
|Relegated to the 1. divisjon
|-
|2006
|1. divisjon
|2nd
|align=right |5
|align=right|30||align=right|15||align=right|7||align=right|9
|align=right|65||align=right|49||align=right|49
|Fourth round
|
|-
|2007
|1. divisjon
|2nd
|align=right bgcolor=#DDFFDD| 3
|align=right|30||align=right|17||align=right|4||align=right|9
|align=right|66||align=right|39||align=right|55
|Fourth round
|Promoted to the Tippeligaen through playoffs
|-
|2008
|Tippeligaen
|Top
|align=right |4
|align=right|26||align=right|12||align=right|6||align=right|8
|align=right|37||align=right|38||align=right|42
|Quarter-final
|
|-
|2009
|Tippeligaen
|Top
|align=right bgcolor="#FFCCCC"| 15
|align=right|30||align=right|6||align=right|10||align=right|14
|align=right|29||align=right|53||align=right|28
|Third round
|Relegated to the 1. divisjon
|-
|2010
|1. divisjon
|2nd
|align=right |6
|align=right|28||align=right|12||align=right|6||align=right|10
|align=right|41||align=right|28||align=right|42
|Third round
|
|-
|2011
|1. divisjon
|2nd
|align=right |5
|align=right|30||align=right|15||align=right|7||align=right|8
|align=right|52||align=right|38||align=right|52
|Third round
|
|-
|2012
|1. divisjon
|2nd
|align=right |5
|align=right|30||align=right|13||align=right|9||align=right|8
|align=right|59||align=right|36||align=right|48
|Quarter-final
|
|-
|2013
|1. divisjon
|2nd
|align=right bgcolor=#DDFFDD| 1
|align=right|30||align=right|21||align=right|4||align=right|5
|align=right|63||align=right|24||align=right|67
|Quarter-final
|Promoted to the Tippeligaen
|-
|2014
|Tippeligaen
|Top
|align=right |13
|align=right|30||align=right|10||align=right|5||align=right|15
|align=right|45||align=right|60||align=right|35
|Fourth round
|
|-
|2015
|Tippeligaen
|Top
|align=right |9
|align=right|30||align=right|12||align=right|4||align=right|14
|align=right|53||align=right|56||align=right|40
|Third round
|
|-
|2016 
|Tippeligaen
|Top
|align=right bgcolor="#FFCCCC"| 15
|align=right|30||align=right|8||align=right|6||align=right|16
|align=right|36||align=right|45||align=right|30
|Semi-final
|Relegated to the 1. divisjon
|-
|2017 
|1. divisjon
|2nd
|align=right bgcolor=#DDFFDD| 1
|align=right|30||align=right|22||align=right|5||align=right|3
|align=right|83||align=right|33||align=right|71
|Third round
|Promoted to the Eliteserien
|-
|2018 
|Eliteserien
|Top
|align=right |11
|align=right|30||align=right|6||align=right|14||align=right|10
|align=right|32||align=right|35||align=right|32
|Quarter-final
|
|-
|2019 
|Eliteserien
|Top
|align=right bgcolor=silver|2
|align=right|30||align=right|15||align=right|9||align=right|6
|align=right|64||align=right|44||align=right|54
|Second round
|
|-
|2020
|Eliteserien
|Top
|align=right bgcolor=gold|1
|align=right|30||align=right|26||align=right|3||align=right|1
|align=right|103||align=right|32||align=right|81
|Cancelled
|
|-
|2021 
|Eliteserien
|Top
|align=right bgcolor=gold|1
|align=right|30||align=right|18||align=right|9||align=right|3
|align=right|59||align=right|25||align=right|63
|bgcolor=silver|Final
|
|-
|2022 
|Eliteserien
|Top
|align=right bgcolor=silver|2
|align=right|30||align=right|18||align=right|6||align=right|6
|align=right|86||align=right|41||align=right|60
||
|
|}
1 Third tier was renamed as 2. divisjon (Top tier renamed as Tippeligaen, 2nd tier renamed as 1. divisjon) ahead of 1991 season.

Europe 

Bodø/Glimt have participated in European Cups a number of times. The first time was in 1976, when they lost against Napoli in the Cup Winners' Cup. In 1978, they lost to Inter Milan, and in 1994 to Sampdoria in the same competition. 

In 2004, they lost to Beşiktaş in the first round of the UEFA Cup and in 2020 to A.C. Milan in the first qualifying round of the UEFA Europa League. Due to a shortened season during the COVID-19 pandemic, the double against Milan was played as a single match at San Siro, with no return leg. Glimt was narrowly defeated then by a score of 3–2. 

In 2021, they made their debut UEFA Champions League appearance, facing Legia Warsaw from Poland's Ekstraklasa in the first qualifying round. After being eliminated in the first round, the club managed to make their debut in the group stage of UEFA Europa Conference League, where they recorded surprisingly positive results, winning over A.S. Roma 8–3 on aggregate and reaching past this stage to eventually defeat Celtic F.C. and gain a place in the Round of 16 in 2022. The club managed to reach the quarter-finals of UEFA Europa Conference League then, eventually losing to future champions AS Roma, while initially managing to win over them in the first match of the double.

Honours

League
Eliteserien
Winners (2): 2020, 2021
Runners-up: 1977, 1993, 2003, 2019, 2022
1. divisjon
Winners (2): 2013, 2017

Cups
Norwegian Cup
Winners (2): 1975, 1993
Runners-up: 1977, 1996, 2003, 2021–22
North-Norwegian championships
Winners (9): 1930, 1933, 1934, 1939, 1952, 1963, 1964, 1967, 1969
Runners-up (5): 1949, 1955, 1961, 1962, 1966

Current squad 

 
 
 
 

For season transfers, see transfers winter 2022–23 and transfers summer 2023.

Coaching staff

Administrative staff

Managers 

 Jørgen Juve (1939)
 Arvid Halvorsen (1963–1965)
 Andreas Berg (1965–1969)
 Karl Adamek (1970)
 Andreas Berg (1971–1975)
 Odd Bjørn Kristoffersen (1975–1977)
 René van Eck (1978)
 Odd Bjørn Kristoffersen (1978)
 Erik Ruthford Pedersen (1979–1980)
 Joe Hooley (1981)
 Harald Berg (1981)
 Odd Bjørn Kristoffersen (1981)
 Truls Klausen (1982)
 Andreas Berg (1983)
 Harald Berg (1983)
 Jacob Klette (1984)
 Øystein Gåre (1985–1989)
 Odd Bjørn Kristoffersen (1989–1990)
 Jan Muri (1991)
 Trond Sollied (1992–1996)
 Øystein Gåre (1997–1998)
 Dag Opjordsmoen (1999–2001)
 Øystein Gåre (2001–2004)
 Kent Bergersen (2005–2007)
 Kåre Ingebrigtsen (2008–2011)
 Cato André Hansen (2011–2012)
 Jan Halvor Halvorsen (2013–2015)
 Aasmund Bjørkan (2015–2017)
 Kjetil Knutsen (2018–)

Kit 

The club is known to play in yellow kits. However, it wasn't until the mid 70s that FK Bodø/Glimt changed their white shorts to an all yellow strip. In 1980 the club signed its first kit-manufacturer deal with the German firm Adidas, though the club used track jackets and shorts from Adidas since 1976. Nordlandsbanken, a major bank in the region, was one of the main sponsor of the club, present on their shirts until 2011. Since the 2007 season, Diadora has been manufacturing the kits.

Sponsorship

Supporters 
Glimt supporters are known as "1916", "Den Gule Horde" (The Yellow Horde), "Glimt i Sør" (Glimt in the South) and "Glimt i Steigen" (Glimt in Steigen). 1916 and Den Gule Horde have merged to form the new supporter group "J-feltet", named from the area of the stadion where the singing supporters are located. Glimt i Sør is a supporter group based in Oslo, the capital of Norway, and has members from across southern Norway. There is also a smaller group called "Glimt i Midten" (Glimt in the Middle) located in and around Trondheim. The Steigen branch is a small group of supporters which are known for their online support, especially on Twitter.

Glimt supporters were among the first to introduce the tradition of singing supporters dressed in club colours to Norwegian stands in the 1970s. The supporters are well known across Norway for bringing a giant toothbrush to their games, a tradition that started after supporter leaders used toothbrushes to conduct the singing, as someone often had a toothbrush in their pockets from traveling to the match. A representative for Jordan, Norway's biggest dental company, spotted this at a match and offered the supporters a sponsor deal. For many years visiting teams have received a yellow toothbrush (of normal size) from Bodø/Glimt's team captain ahead of matches.

References

External links 

 Official web site for Bodø/Glimt
 Glimtforum.Net – Discussion forums

 
Eliteserien clubs
Association football clubs established in 1916
1916 establishments in Norway
Sport in Bodø